Klucz is a part of the city of Szczecin, Poland situated on the right bank of Oder river, south-east of the Szczecin Old Town, and south-west of Szczecin-Dąbie.

Before 1945 when Stettin was a part of Germany, the German name of this suburb was Stettin-Klütz.

Neighbourhoods of Szczecin